Woodfork is a historic plantation house located near Charlotte Court House, Charlotte County, Virginia.  It was built in 1829, and is a three-story, five bay brick dwelling with a gable roof in the Federal style. The front and rear facades feature one bay porches with hipped roofs supported by Tuscan order columns. Also on the property is a contributing a barn and four historic sites: two graveyards, the remains of a brick kiln, and the remains of a barn.

It was listed on the National Register of Historic Places in 2002.

References

Plantation houses in Virginia
Houses on the National Register of Historic Places in Virginia
Federal architecture in Virginia
Houses completed in 1829
Houses in Charlotte County, Virginia
National Register of Historic Places in Charlotte County, Virginia